Andrey Viktorovich Gubin (born 30 April 1974), born Andrey Valerevich Klementyev is a Russian former pop-singer, poet, composer, and record producer.

Early years
Andrey Gubin was born on 30 April 1974 in Ufa. His family moved to Moscow in 1983, where they wandered about because of constant lack of money.

Musical career 
Gubin's first album I Am A Hobo, released when he was 15, sold 200 copies. Gubin's second and third album Ave Maria and Prince and Princess respectively were the start of his career. His first performance on stage with his first hit Stray Boy was in 1994.

In the late 2000s, Gubin left the stage due to serious health problems. In the mid-2000s, he was diagnosed with left-sided trigeminal neuralgia of the face, a disease of the nervous system that causes constant facial pain.

Discography

References
 Andrey Gubin's site

1974 births
Living people
Musicians from Ufa
Russian pop singers
Russian record producers
21st-century Russian singers
21st-century Russian male singers
Winners of the Golden Gramophone Award